Boum may refer to one of the following:

Boum, a type of dhow (Arab sailing vessel)

People
 Boum (born 1985), French Canadian animator, illustrator, and comic strip author

Film and television
 La Boum, a 1980 French language film.

Music
 "Boum!", a popular song by the French singer/songwriter Charles Trenet
 "Boum Boum", song by Enigma from the 2003 album Voyageur
 "Boum Boum Boum" (Shana Tesh song), 2006 song by Shana Tesh
 "Boum Boum Boum", 2014 song and single by the British singer Mika

See also 
 Boom (disambiguation)